Raja Ramanna (28 January 1925 – 24 September 2004) was an Indian physicist who is best known for his role in India's nuclear program during its early stages.

Having joined the nuclear program in 1964, Ramanna worked under Homi Jehangir Bhabha, and later became the director of this program in 1967. Ramanna expanded and supervised scientific research on nuclear weapons and was the first directing officer of the small team of scientists that supervised and carried out the test of the nuclear device, under the codename Smiling Buddha, in 1974.

Ramanna was associated with and directed India's nuclear program for more than four decades, and also initiated industrial defence programmes for the Indian Armed Forces. He was a recipient of Padma Vibhushan, India's second highest civilian decoration, in honour of his services to build India's nuclear programme. Ramanna died in Mumbai in 2004 at the age of 79.

Education

Raja Ramanna was born in beginning of 1925 to Rukmini and Ramanna in Tumkur, in the princely state of Mysore Ruled by British. The parents having recognised his talent for music early in life were instrumental in introducing him to classical European music.  Beginning his studies at Bishop Cotton Boys' School, Bangalore, where he mostly studied literature and classical music, he later attended Madras Christian College and resided at St. Thomas's Hall where he continued his interests in arts and literature but soon shifted back to physics. At Madras Christian College, Ramanna obtained a BSc in physics from the University of Madras and also gained a BA degree in classical music in 1947.

In 1947 Ramanna went on to attend Bombay University where he gained his MSc in Physics, followed by M.Mus. in Music theory. Ramanna was awarded a Commonwealth Scholarship, and travelled to Great Britain in 1952 to complete his doctorate. Ramanna attended London University's King's College and enrolled in a doctoral programme there. In 1954, Raja Ramanna obtained a PhD in Nuclear Physics and also a LRSM from King's College London. In the United Kingdom, Ramanna was invited to do his research at the Atomic Energy Research Establishment (AERE) where he gained expertise in nuclear fuel cycles and reactor designing. While in the UK, Ramanna continued his interest in European music and Western philosophy, attending Opera and Orchestra performances every week.

European music and philosophy remained a lifelong passion for Ramanna, and after returning to India, Ramanna accomplished himself by performing classical European music at many public concerts in India and abroad. Ramanna also had a keen ear for Indian classical music. His musical talents also received wide appreciation in neighbouring Pakistan. In 1956, Ramanna was invited by the National College of Arts and National Academy of Performing Arts to perform and lecture on the classical piano with a live ensemble and received jubilant praise and honour for his performance.

Indian nuclear programme

Ramanna was one of the secretive personalities surrounding the Indian nuclear programme, a programme started and envisioned by Jawaharlal Nehru in 1947, and being directed by Homi J. Bhabha. After his doctorate in physics, Ramanna returned in 1954 to India, where he joined the senior technical staff of Bhabha Atomic Research Centre (BARC), where he worked under Homi J. Bhabha in classified nuclear weapons projects.

While Bhaba dedicated to develop this programme, Ramanna inducted by to choose the preferable nuclear test site to carry out the weapon-testing experiments. The exact dates are unknown, but Ramanna chose and began the underground construction of nuclear test site at an Indian Army base, the Pokhran Test Range (PTR). After the disastrous death of Homi Bhaba, Ramanna was immediately elevated to become the directing officer of this programme. Ramanna, serving as the CDO of BARC, began to take initiate to develop the first nuclear weapon.  At BARC, the initial designing of nuclear weapon was completed under his guidance and the necessary nuclear weapons' explosive material for this weapon was completed under Ramanna by 1970. As the first nuclear device was completed and developed under his guidance, Ramanna went to Indian Prime Minister's Office, where he had notified Indian premier Indira Gandhi about the successful development of the nuclear device.

In 1974, Ramanna and other officials of the BARC verbally notified Indira Gandhi that India was ready to conduct the test of its small miniature nuclear device. Indira Gandhi verbally gave permission to Ramanna to carry out the test, and preparation was taken under Ramanna. Ramanna immediately travelled to Pokhran to pay a visit to the nuclear site that was constructed under his guidance. Preparations were completed under extreme secrecy and the first nuclear device was flown from Trombay to Pokhran Test Range with Ramanna. Ramanna and his team installed the nuclear device in the nuclear test site and necessary preparations were done before Indira Gandhi's visit to his site. In the morning in May 1974, Ramanna conducted the first test of a small nuclear device under codename Smiling Buddha. Pictures of Indira Gandhi inspecting the aftermath of the explosion site were flashed on front pages of newspapers in India and the world over with Ramanna and Dr. Homi Sethna, India's top nuclear scientist duo, by her side. Following this achievement, Ramanna gained international fame and was also honoured with India's second highest civilian award in 1975 by the Indira Gandhi's administration.

In 1978, Saddam Hussein approached Ramanna for help to build an Iraqi nuclear bomb. The offer came while Ramanna was in Baghdad for a week as Saddam's personal guest. He was given a tour of the capital and Iraq's main nuclear facility at Tuwaitha. At the end of the trip, Saddam invited the scientist to his office and told him: "You have done enough for your country; don't go back. Stay here and take over our nuclear programme. I will pay you whatever you want." Ramanna was shocked and scared by the Iraqi proposal. He reportedly could not sleep that night, worried that he might never see his homeland again. He took the next flight out.

Later in his career, Ramanna advocated for the strict policies to prevent nuclear proliferation. Ramanna also travelled to Pakistan, where he attended the annual International Physics Conference to deliver a lecture on nuclear physics, notably lectures on nuclear force. Ramanna began lobbying for peace process between India and Pakistan, and was a leading force to prevent nuclear escalation in the region. Later in the 1980s and 1990s, Ramanna served as Director General of the Defence Research and Development Organisation (DRDO) and as scientific adviser to the Defence Minister of India in 2000. He was a member of the Defence Research & Development Service (DRDS). Ramanna also joined the International Atomic Energy Agency in 1984 where he served as the President of the 30th General Conference of the IAEA.

Interests

A multi-faceted personality, Ramanna was a gifted musician, and could play the piano as dextrously as he could speak about atomic energy. Music was close to his heart, and one of the two books he wrote was The Structure of Music in Raga And Western Systems (1993). The other was his autobiography, entitled Years of Pilgrimage (1991).

Minister of State

In 1990, Ramanna was made Union minister of State for defence by V.P. Singh administration. He was a nominated member of the Rajya Sabha from 1997 to 2003. Dr. Ramanna was closely associated with the I.I.T. Bombay, having been chairman of the board of Governors for three consecutive terms from 1975 to 1984. In 2000, Ramanna was also the first director of National Institute of Advanced Studies, Bangalore.

Institute Named After Ramanna
 Raja Ramanna Centre for Advanced Technology, Indore (M.P.)

Posts held
 Chairman, Governing Council, Indian Institute of Science, Bangalore
 Council of Management, Jawaharlal Nehru Centre for Advanced Scientific Research, Bangalore
 Chairman, Board of Governors, Indian Institute of Technology, Bombay
 President, Indian National Science Academy
 Vice-President, Indian Academy of Sciences
 Scientific Adviser to the Minister of Defence
 Director-general of Defence Research and Development Organisation (DRDO)
 Secretary for Defence Research, Government of India
 Chairman, Atomic Energy Commission
 Secretary, Department of Atomic Energy
 Director, Bhabha Atomic Research Centre
 Director, National Institute of Advanced Studies, IISc campus, Bangalore

Awards
 Shanti Swarup Bhatnagar Prize for Science and Technology in 1963
 Padma Shri in 1968
 Padma Bhushan in 1973
 Padma Vibhushan in 1975

Books
 The Structure of Music in Raga and Western Systems
   Years of Pilgrimage ( Autobiography) (1991)

References

Further reading
 
 Ramanna, Raja. Years of Pilgrimage: An Autobiography. New Delhi: Viking, 1991.
 Srinivasan, M. R. From Fission to Fusion: The Story of India's Atomic Energy Programme. New Delhi: Viking, 2002.
 Singh, Jagjit. Some Eminent Indian Scientists. New Delhi: Publications Division, Govt. of India.
 Sundaram, C.V., L. V. Krishnan, and T. S. Iyengar. Atomic Energy in India: 50 Years. Mumbai: Department of Atomic Energy, 1998.
  Parthasarathy, K. S. Ramanna: a doyen among scientists, The Hindu, September 30, 2004.
  Srinivasan, M. R. Ramanna & the nuclear programme, The Hindu, September 28, 2004.
  Sreekantan, B.V. Raja Ramanna–Down the Memory Lane. Current Science, Vol. 87, No. 8, pp. 1150–51, 2004.
  Rao, K. R. Raja Ramanna-A Personal Tribute. Current Science, Vol. 87, No. 8, pp. 1152–54, 2004.
  Profiles in Scientific Research: Contributions of the Fellows. Vol.1. pp. 460–62. New Delhi: Indian National Science Academy, 1995.
  Iyengar, P.K. Remembering Ramanna. The Hindu, September 25, 2004.
 Ramanna, R., Jain, S. R., Pramana vol. 57, 263, 2001.

External links
Interview with Dr. Raja Ramanna
Obituary in rediff.com
Biography in Vigyan Prasar Science Portal

1925 births
2004 deaths
Alumni of King's College London
20th-century Indian physicists
Indian nuclear physicists
Recipients of the Padma Vibhushan in science & engineering
Recipients of the Padma Bhushan in science & engineering
Recipients of the Padma Shri in science & engineering
Indian institute directors
People from Tumkur
International Atomic Energy Agency officials
Bishop Cotton Boys' School alumni
Nominated members of the Rajya Sabha
University of Madras alumni
Scientists from Karnataka
Janata Dal politicians
Rajya Sabha members from Uttar Pradesh